Grandidierina is a genus of skinks, lizards in the family Scincidae. The genus is endemic to Madagascar.

Species
The following four species, listed alphabetically by specific name, are recognized as being valid.

Grandidierina fierinensis 
Grandidierina lineata 
Grandidierina petiti 
Grandidierina rubrocaudata 

Nota bene: A binomial authority in parentheses indicates that the species was originally described in a genus other than Grandidierina.

References

Further reading
Mocquard F (1894). "Reptiles nouveaux ou insuffisamment conus de Madagascar ". Compte Rendu Sommaire des Séances de la Société Philomathique de Paris, Huitième Série [Eighth Series] 6 (17): 3–10. (Grandidierina, new genus, p. 6). (in French).

Grandidierina
Lizard genera
Endemic fauna of Madagascar
Taxa named by François Mocquard